Gašper Katrašnik (born 20 June 1995) is a Slovenian former racing cyclist, who competed as a professional from 2016 to 2021 for UCI Continental team .

Major results

2012
 1st  Road race, National Junior Road Championships
 5th Road race, UEC European Junior Road Championships
2015
 1st Grand Prix Sarajevo
 7th Road race, UEC European Under-23 Road Championships
 8th GP Izola
2016
 9th GP Kranj
 10th GP Adria Mobil
2017
 5th Belgrade–Banja Luka I
 7th Overall Tour of Małopolska
 7th Belgrade–Banja Luka II
 8th GP Izola
 10th Gran Premio della Liberazione
2018
 1st  Overall Belgrade–Banja Luka
1st Stages 1 & 2
 1st Stage 4 Szlakiem Grodów Piastowskich
 5th Poreč Trophy
2019
 2nd Road race, National Road Championships
 9th Poreč Trophy
2020
 2nd Poreč Trophy

References

External links

1995 births
Living people
Slovenian male cyclists
Sportspeople from Kranj
Competitors at the 2018 Mediterranean Games
Mediterranean Games competitors for Slovenia